Artemisia monosperma is a species of flowering plant in the wormwood genus Artemisia, family Asteraceae, native to Libya, Egypt, the Levant, and the Arabian Peninsula. It plays an important role in ecological succession by stabilizing sand dunes.

References

monosperma
Flora of Libya
Flora of Egypt
Flora of Sinai
Flora of Palestine (region)
Flora of Lebanon
Flora of Syria
Flora of the Arabian Peninsula
Plants described in 1813